The 1962 Texas Tech Red Raiders football team represented Texas Technological College—now known as Texas Tech University—as a member of the Southwest Conference (SWC) during the 1962 NCAA University Division football season. In their second season under head coach J. T. King, the Red Raiders compiled a 1–9 record (0–7 against conference opponents), finished in last out of eight teams in the SWC, and were outscored by opponents by a combined total of 250 to 83. The team's statistical leaders included Doug Cannon with 274 passing yards, Roger Gill with 379 rushing yards, and David Parks with 399 receiving yards. The team played its home games at Clifford B. and Audrey Jones Stadium.

Schedule

References

Texas Tech
Texas Tech Red Raiders football seasons
Texas Tech Red Raiders football